Tanner's Settlement is a community in the Canadian province of Nova Scotia, located in the Lunenburg Municipal District in Lunenburg County.  It is northeast of Grimm's Settlement and east of Cosman's Meadow.

Communities in Lunenburg County, Nova Scotia
General Service Areas in Nova Scotia